Zhang Xingjia (born 12 January 1999) is a Chinese equestrian. He competed in the individual jumping event at the 2020 Summer Olympics.

References

External links
 

1999 births
Living people
Chinese male equestrians
Olympic equestrians of China
Equestrians at the 2020 Summer Olympics
Place of birth missing (living people)
Show jumping riders